Ponceau (French for "poppy-colored") is the generic name for a family of azo dyes, and may refer to:
 Ponceau 2R (also called Xylidine ponceau or Ponceau G, among other synonyms), used in histology for staining
 Ponceau 3R, a delisted food colorant
 Ponceau 4R (known by more than 100 synonyms), a synthetic colourant used as a food colouring (E Number E124)
 Ponceau 6R (Ponceau 6R or Crystal ponceau 6R, among other synonyms), a food dye (E number E126) and a histology stain
 Ponceau S (also known as Acid Red 112 or C.I. 27195), a histology stain
 Ponceau SX, another name for Scarlet GN, once used as a food dye (E number E125)